= Aboubakar Ouattara (football manager) =

Ivorian football manager)

Personal information
- Full name: Aboubakar Rassoul Bowa Ouattara
- Place of birth: Ivory Coast

Managerial career
- Years: Team
- 1995–1999: Asante Kotoko
- 2008–2009: AS Vita Club
- TP Mazembe (technical director)
- Wydad
- 2024–: Hearts of Oak

Aboubakar Ouattara is an Ivorian football manager who manages Hearts of Oak.

== Life and career ==
Ouattara was born in the Ivory Coast. He has been a Muslim.

In 1995, he was appointed manager of Ghanaian side Asante Kotoko. He was arrested for fraud while managing the club.

After that, he was appointed technical director of Democratic Republic of the Congo side TP Mazembe. He helped the club win the league and the CAF Champions League.

He was thereafter appointed technical director of Moroccan side Wydad. He helped the club win the league and the CAF Champions League. In 2024, he was appointed manager of Ghanaian side Hearts of Oak. He was described as "narrowly escaped relegation by securing a crucial win against Bechem United on the final day [of the 2023/24 season]" while managing the club.
